Robert Aunger or Angre (fl. 1390s) of Bath, Somerset, was an English politician.

He was a Member (MP) of the Parliament of England for Bath in January 1397 and Mayor of Bath in 1396.

References

Year of birth missing
Year of death missing
English MPs January 1397
14th-century English politicians
Mayors of Bath, Somerset